The first series of the New Zealand television reality music competition The X Factor premiered on TV3 on 21 April 2013 and ended on 22 July 2013. The show was open to singers aged 14 and over. The contestants were split into the show's four traditional categories: Boys, Girls, Over 25s and Groups.

The winner was 22-year-old Greymouth singer Jackie Thomas, and her winner's single, "It's Worth It", was released the day of the final. As the winner, Thomas received a Sony Music Entertainment New Zealand recording contract and a new car. Runners-up Whenua Patuwai and Benny Tipene each released a single via Sony. Fourth-place-getters Moorhouse were also signed to Sony Music New Zealand, with plans for an album release by Christmas 2013.

The series was hosted by Dominic Bowden. Recording artists Daniel Bedingfield, Melanie Blatt, Ruby Frost and Stan Walker were the show's four judges. Auckland student Georgie Wright was selected from over 100 applicants to present the show's behind-the-scenes video blog Samsung Insider.

The initial pre-audition tour of 27 towns and cities was held in January and early February 2013, with the judges auditions round filmed in late February and early March, and the bootcamp filmed in mid-March in Auckland. The series screened on Sunday and Monday evenings.

Development
The X Factor was created by Simon Cowell in the United Kingdom and the New Zealand version is based on the original UK series. TV3 initially purchased the rights to produce a local version of The X Factor in 2010. In September 2012, TV3 finally confirmed that the show would begin production in early 2013. Broadcast funding agency NZ On Air confirmed they would contribute $1.6 million as a minority investor, for the production of 30 episodes of 60 minutes duration each.

The series was co-produced by MediaWorks and FremantleMedia Australia. The show's key sponsors were Ford New Zealand as broadcast sponsor, Samsung Electronics as technology partner with McDonald's and Coca-Cola as programme partners.

Judges and host 

In November 2012, Australian Idol winner and recording artist, Stan Walker, was announced as the first judge. In December 2012, Daniel Bedingfield was announced as the second judge. The following month, Ruby Frost and former All Saints member, Melanie Blatt, were confirmed as the final two judges.

In October 2012 Dominic Bowden was confirmed as the host.

Selection process

Pre-auditions 

The first appeal for applicants was made on 11 November 2012, with the announcement of the application process and the pre-audition tour details. Pre-auditions in front of the show's producers began on 5 January 2013 and continued through 27 towns and cities across New Zealand. More than 6,000 contestants auditioned, and were either rejected outright with a "no" response or considered for the next round with a "maybe" response.

Judges' auditions

The auditionees chosen by the producers were invited back to the last set of auditions that took place in front of the judges and a live studio audience. These auditions were filmed at Skycity Theatre in Auckland from 26 February to 3 March and broadcast from 21 to 29 April. The 120 successful contestants then progressed to the bootcamp round.

 Auditions 1 (21 April 2013)Special appearance: Ronan KeatingFeatured successful auditionees: Finlay Robertson, Nick Van de Vlierd, Aotea Beazley, The Steamrollers, Benny Tipene, Maaka Fiso, Meryl Cassie, Madeline Bradley, William Tokelau and Te Ao Te Huia.
 Auditions 2 (22 April 2013)Special appearance: Topp TwinsFeatured successful auditionees: Franko Heke, Ashley Tonga, L.O.V.E, The Talent, Voltech, Gap5, Fletcher Mills, Cameron Luxton, Jessie Matthews, Tia Hunt, Cameron Rota, Sam Yeoward and Renee Maurice. 
 Auditions 3 (28 April 2013)Featured successful auditionees: Taiaroa Neho, Alex Familton, Anabac, Liam Kennedy-Clark, Eden Roberts, Tjay Faaosofia, Vasa Faaosofia, Cassie Henderson, Tom Batchelor, Oriana Faaumu and Bryan Townley. 
 Auditions 4 (29 April 2013)Featured successful auditionees: 3rd Watch, Shaan Singh, Taye Williams, Anna Wilson, Brianna Phillips, Jordan Edwards, Fadzai Paradza, Sorelle, Finley Brentwood, Preeti Narayan, Puhi Tau, Phebe Martin-Holgate, Sharaine Barrett, Hannah Cosgrove, Jasmyn Kereama, Khona Va’aga-Gray, Esther Crispin, Whenua Patuwai, Tania Pari, Moorhouse and Jackie Thomas.

Fast Ford Boot Camp 

The Edge radio station and series sponsor Ford held a second-chance competition called Fast Ford Boot Camp. Chosen from video auditions, five acts attended the week-long Fast Ford Boot Camp in Auckland before auditioning in front of three X Factor judges live on The Edge's breakfast show on 15 March.  From there, singers Geordie Meade, Meghan Fraser and Grace Ikenasio were chosen by the judges to continue to the X Factor bootcamp round.

Bootcamp 

The bootcamp round was filmed at Vector Arena in Auckland from 16 to 21 March and broadcast on 5 and 6 May. Contestants were given two performance challenges. On the first day, the 120 contestants were split into the four category groups - Boys, Girls, Over 25s and Groups. Acts in each category were given one song to sing: "Come On Home" (Boys), "Firework" (Girls), "Iris" (Over 25s) and "Man in the Mirror" (Groups).  Contestants were aided by vocal coach Turanga Merito and choreographer Emma McLachlan. After the performances, the judges sent home half the acts. On the second day, the remaining 60 acts were put into ensembles and chose a song which they had to learn and perform for the judges.  From the bootcamp, 24 successful acts (six in each category) progressed to the judges' retreats round. Rejected soloists Sam Yeoward and Cameron Rota from the Boys category and former 3rd Watch member Peniamina Sofai were brought back by judges and asked to form a group. This group was named The Young Project (TYP).

The elimination of popular contestant Jackie Thomas, who had performed poorly at bootcamp, stirred debate amongst viewers.  A Facebook group was formed urging the show to bring her back, while Birdy's 2011 recording of Jackie's audition song "Skinny Love" entered the New Zealand charts, peaking at number 2.  At judges' retreats, Daniel Bedingfield made the decision to bring back Jackie to join the six girls at his retreat.

The 25 successful acts were: 
Boys: Tom Batchelor, Liam Kennedy-Clark, Fletcher Mills, Taiaroa Neho, Whenua Patuwai, Benny Tipene
Girls: Aotea Beazley, Madeline Bradley, Oriana Faaumu, Cassie Henderson, Eden Roberts, Finlay Robertson, Jackie Thomas
Over 25s: Maaka Fiso, Grace Ikenasio, Jessie Matthews, Bryan Townley, Taye Williams, Anna Wilson
Groups: Anabac, Gap5, L.O.V.E, Moorhouse, Voltech, The Young Project (TYP)

Judges' retreats 

The judges retreats episodes were filmed over the month of April in locations in New Zealand, the Cook Islands and Australia.  The judges received news of their categories from the show's producer via telephone, seen during the second bootcamp episode on 6 May. Daniel Bedingfield also brought previously eliminated contestant Jackie Thomas back to the Girls category. Bedingfield mentored the Girls in Rarotonga, assisted by his sister Natasha Bedingfield; Blatt joined the Groups at Mahurangi with S Club 7 member Rachel Stevens; Frost took the Boys to Sydney, assisted by former Australian X Factor judge Guy Sebastian; and Walker had the Over 25s in Queenstown with New Zealand singer Hollie Smith. Each act performed one song for their mentor and assistant. The judges then selected their top three contestants, which make up the final 12 and progressed to the live shows.

At the end of judges' retreats, it was announced that each judge could bring one further act back as a wildcard. The public then voted for which of the four wildcards would become the 13th finalist. This left one judge with an extra act. Fletcher Mills was revealed as the winner on 14 May. The show's producers had originally intended for the wildcard to be announced on the first live show on 19 May, but after judge Melanie Blatt mistakenly tweeted the news on 14 May, the official announcement was made early.

Key:
 – Wildcard Winner

Contestants
Key:
 – Winner
 – Runner-Up
 – Third Place

Live shows 
The live shows began on 19 May and were filmed at Auckland Film Studios in Henderson, Auckland. The shows were simulcast on national radio network More FM.

Results summary
Colour key
  – Act in the bottom two and had to perform in the final showdown
  – Act was in the bottom three but received the fewest votes and was immediately eliminated
  – Act received the lowest number of public votes and was immediately eliminated (no final showdown)

Live show details

Week 1 (19/20 May) 
 Theme: Number-one singles 
 Musical guests: Willy Moon ("Yeah Yeah") and Ruby Frost ("Volition")

 Judges' vote to eliminate
 Bedingfield: L.O.V.E - backed his own act, Eden Roberts.
 Blatt: Eden Roberts - backed her own act, L.O.V.E.
 Frost: Eden Roberts - felt L.O.V.E were more entertaining. 
 Walker: Eden Roberts - felt that Roberts had received all the exposure she needed from the show.

Week 2 (26/27 May) 
 Theme: New Zealand music 
 Musical guests: Annabel Fay ("Warrior") and Smashproof ("Paint Fade")

 Judges' vote to eliminate 
 Blatt: Taye Williams - backed her own act, L.O.V.E.
 Walker: L.O.V.E - backed his own act, Taye Williams.
 Bedingfield: Taye Williams - gave no reason.
 Frost: L.O.V.E - felt she could see Williams as a recording artist.
With the acts in the bottom two receiving two votes each, the result went to deadlock and reverted to the earlier public vote. Taye Williams was eliminated as the act with the fewest public votes.

Week 3 (2/3 June) 
 Theme: Best of British 
 Musical guests: Stan Walker ("Bulletproof") and Joseph & Maia ("Nothing I Can Do")

 Judges' vote to eliminate 
 Blatt refused to send home either of her acts.
 Walker: L.O.V.E - felt they had a lot of fight in them and would do well after the show.
 Bedingfield: L.O.V.E - felt whatever happened would be good for them.
 Frost was not required to vote since there was already a majority.

Week 4 (9/10 June) 
 Theme: Soul classics 
 Musical guests: Titanium ("Tattoo") and Aaradhna ("You Don't Love Me Anymore") 
 Two acts were eliminated from the fourth results show.

 Judges' vote to eliminate
 Walker: Gap5 - backed his own act, Maaka Fiso.
 Blatt: Maaka Fiso - backed her own act, Gap5.
 Bedingfield: Maaka Fiso - felt Gap5 would sell records.
 Frost: Maaka Fiso - felt Gap5 were better suited to the competition.

Week 5 (16/17 June) 
 Theme: Top 40 
 Musical guests: Sons of Zion ("Superman") and Jamie McDell ("Life in Sunshine")

 Judges' vote to eliminate 
 Blatt: Anna Wilson - backed her own act, Gap5.
 Walker: Gap5 - backed his own act, Anna Wilson.
 Frost: Anna Wilson - felt Wilson did not have a clear identity.
 Bedingfield: Anna Wilson - felt Gap5 had more potential as popstars.

Week 6 (23/24 June) 
 Theme: Songs from movies
 Musical guests: Dane Rumble ("Not Alone") and Reece Mastin ("Rock Star")

 Judges' vote to eliminate
 Frost refused to send home either of her acts.
 Blatt: Benny Tipene - felt his heart was not in it.
 Bedingfield: Tom Batchelor - gave no reason.
 Walker: Tom Batchelor - gave no reason.

Week 7 (30 June/1 July) 
 Theme: Made in America
 Musical guests: Aotearoa Reggae All Stars ("Sensitive to a Smile") and Manic Street Preachers ("If You Tolerate This Your Children Will Be Next")

 Judges' vote to eliminate
 Blatt: Cassie Henderson - backed her own act, Gap5.
 Bedingfield: Gap5 - backed his own act, Cassie Henderson.
 Frost: Gap5 - felt their recent performances had been unprofessional.
 Walker: Gap5 - felt Henderson still had a lot of potential.

Week 8: Quarter-Final (7/8 July) 
 Theme: Coke Choice (songs from act's year of birth, as chosen by public online vote) 
 Musical guests: Daniel Bedingfield ("Every Little Thing")  and Timomatic ("Parachute")

Coke Choice 

Songs performed during week eight were chosen by public vote from a shortlist of three songs from the contestant's birth year. Voting was done via The X Factor Facebook page, running from 17 to 29 June.

Key:
 – Chosen Song

 Judges' vote to eliminate
 Bedingfield: Whenua Patuwai - backed his own act, Cassie Henderson.
 Frost: Cassie Henderson - backed her own act, Whenua Patuwai.
 Walker: Cassie Henderson - gave no reason.
 Blatt: Whenua Patuwai - felt the business would be too harmful for Patuwai.

With the acts in the bottom two receiving two votes each, the result went to deadlock deadlock and reverted to the earlier public vote. Cassie Henderson was eliminated as the act with the fewest public votes.

Week 9: Semi-Final (14/15 July) 
 Themes: Love and heartbreak; the best of rock
 Musical guests: Stan Walker ("Inventing Myself") and Ginny Blackmore ("Bones")

Notes
 For the first time this series, each act performed two songs.
 The semi-final did not feature a final showdown and instead the act with the fewest public votes, Moorhouse, was automatically eliminated. After their elimination, Moorhouse performed "Mirrors".

Week 10: Final (21/22 July)

21 July 

 Themes: Judges' choice; duets

Notes
 In the duets section, acts duetted with a New Zealand artist, singing a previous hit for that artist.

22 July 
 Musical guests: The top 13 contestants ("Get Lucky") and Guy Sebastian ("Get Along").

Notes
For the first time this series there was no theme.

Ratings
The grand final decider episode on Monday 22 July had a cume (cumulative audience) of 1,326,000 viewers in the 5+ demographic and an average audience of 598,100.  During the series, 3,285,500 viewers watched the show at some stage.

N.Z. Nielsen ratings
 Colour key:
  – Highest rating during the season
  – Lowest rating during the season

References

External links
Official website

New Zealand 01
2013 New Zealand television seasons
series 01